Stratiolaelaps scimitus (formerly Hypoaspis miles) is a small (0.5 mm) light brown mite that lives in the top  layer of soil. As a natural predator of fungus gnat pupae and of the snail parasite Riccardoella limacum it is used by gardeners and snail breeders for biological pest control. Stratiolaelaps scimitus is also commonly used by reptile, amphibian and invertebrate keepers as a preventative or reactive measure against grain mites and reptile mites. Whereas most mite treatments are based on synthetic chemicals, predatory mites are used as a biological method of preventing and curing mite infestations.

Stratiolaelaps scimitus and the similar species, S. aculiefer are soil-dwelling, predatory mites. Stratiolaelaps mites feed on fungus gnats, springtails, thrips pupae, and other small insects in the soil. It inhabits the top  layer of soil. Females lay eggs in the soil which hatch into nymphs in 1 to 2 days. Nymphs develop into adults in 5 to 6 days. The lifecycle takes approximately 7 to 11 days. Both nymphs and adults feed on soil-inhabiting pests, consuming up to 5 prey per day. They may survive by feeding on algae and/or plant debris when insects are unavailable. Both males and females are present, but males are smaller and rarely seen.

Stratiolaelaps is well adapted to moist conditions in greenhouses in a variety of growing media, but does not tolerate standing water. Hypoaspis is currently used in greenhouses for control of fungus gnats. It feeds on fungus gnat eggs and small larvae and is most effective when applied before fungus gnat populations become established or when populations are low. It has been successfully used in bedding plant production, potted plants, and poinsettia stock plants. Stratiolaelaps will also attack thrips pupae in the soil, but cannot be relied on alone for thrips control in a commercial greenhouse. It may, however, enhance biological control when used in conjunction with predators feeding on thrips on the foliage. In small-scale experiments this mite reduced emergence of adult thrips to about 30% of that in controls.

References

External links 
 Using Hypoaspis miles to rid snails and slugs of pests such as Riccardoella limacum

Laelapidae
Biological control agents of pest insects
Animals described in 1892